Blake Lazarus (born 9 June 1988) is a former professional Greek international rugby league footballer who played for the Wests Tigers in the NRL competition,  later expanding his career playing in the French elite competition for Avignon Bisons. In 2011, he returned to Australia continuing his career with the Sydney Roosters and Newtown.

Background
Lazarus was born in New South Wales, Australia. He is of Greek , Irish and Australian Aboriginal heritage.

Playing career
Lazarus played junior football with Eagle Vale St Andrews. His uncle is five time NRL Grand Final winner Glenn Lazarus.

After injuries to Tim Moltzen and Robert Lui, Lazarus was chosen to make his debut in round six of the 2010 NRL season. He had one more appearance for the season against the Penrith Panthers.

Having been released by Wests Tigers, Lazarus joined the Avignon Bisons in France at the end of the 2010 season.

In 2011 Lazarus played for Newtown in the NSW Cup and also represented the Greek national side against Vanuatu.

Lazarus again represented Greece in 2014, scoring 3 tries and kicking 8 goals from 9 attempts in a game against Thailand.

References

External links
Wests Tigers profile
NSWRL profile
NRL profile
Blake Lazarus

1988 births
Living people
Australian people of Greek descent
Australian rugby league players
Balmain Ryde-Eastwood Tigers players
Greece national rugby league team players
Newtown Jets NSW Cup players
Rugby league fullbacks
Rugby league halfbacks
Rugby league players from New South Wales
Sporting Olympique Avignon players
Wests Tigers players